Nationality words link to articles with information on the nation's poetry or literature (for instance, Irish or France).

Events
 Raymond Souster founds the League of Canadian Poets
 Philip Hobsbaum, who had founded The Belfast Group in Belfast, Northern Ireland, in 1963, departs for Glasgow, and the Belfast Group meetings lapsed for a while, but then was reconstituted in 1968 by Michael Allen, Arthur Terry, and Seamus Heaney. At one time or another, the grouping also includes Michael Longley, James Simmons, Paul Muldoon, Ciaran Carson, Stewart Parker, Bernard MacLaverty and the critic Edna Longley. Meetings will be held at Seamus and Marie Heaney's house on Ashley Avenue. The Belfast Group will last until 1972.
 Russian poet Joseph Brodsky returns to Leningrad from the exile near the Arctic Circle where he had been sent when a Soviet court in 1964 convicted him of "parasitism".
 Starting this year and continuing for a decade, Bulgarian censors prevent publication of works by Konstantin Pavlov, poet and screenwriter who was defiant against his country's communist regime; his popularity didn't wane, as Bulgarians clandestinely copied and read his poems.
 Ted Hughes and Daniel Weissbort found Modern Poetry in Translation (MPT), a British journal focusing on the art of translating poetry. Later defunct, the magazine was relaunched in 2004 under editors David and Helen Constantine.
 The journal L'éphémère founded in France; poets associated with it include Yves Bonnefoy, Jacques Dupin and André du Bouchet; it ceased publication in 1973

Works published in English

Listed by nation where the work was first published (and again by the poet's native land, if different); substantially revised works listed separately:

Canada
 Margaret Avison, The Dumbfounding
 Earle Birney, Selected Poems
 Arthur Bourinot, Watcher of Men: selected poems (1947–66)
 George Bowering, The Silver Wire
 Leonard Cohen, The Parasites of Heaven
 John Robert Colombo, Miraculous Montages
 Robert Finch, Silverthorn Bush and Other Poems.
 Lakshni Gill, During Rain I Plant Chrysanthemums
 Ralph Gustafson, Sift in an Hourglass
 George Johnston, Home Free
 Gwendolyn MacEwen, A Breakfast for Barbarians
 Richard Outram, Exultante Jubilee
 Joe Rosenblatt, The LSD Leacock. Toronto: Coach House Press.
 F. R. Scott, Selected Poems. Toronto: Oxford University Press.
 A. J. M. Smith, and F. R. Scott, editors, The Oxford Book of Canadian Verse, second edition (see also, first edition 1958)
 Raymond Souster, ed. New Wave Canada, anthology of seven young writers
 Miriam Waddington, The Glass Trumpet

India, in English
 Nissim Ezekiel, Collected Poems ( Poetry in English ),
 Arvind Krishna Mehrotra, Bharatmata: A Prayer ( Poetry in English ), an experimental work published by the author's own publishing house; Bombay: Ezra-Fakir Press
 Dom Moraes, Beldam & Others ( Poetry in English ) 
 Gieve Patel, Poems ( Poetry in English ), Mumbai: Nissim Ezekiel .
 G. S. Sharat Chandra, Bharata Natyam Dancer and Other Poems ( Poetry in English ), Calcutta: Writers Workshop, India .
 Leela Dharmaraj, Slum Silhouette and Other Poems ( Poetry in English ), Calcutta: Writers Workshop, India .
 R. P. N. Sinha, editor, A Book of English Verse on Indian Soil, New Delhi: Orient Longmans

Ireland
 Austin Clarke, Mnemosyne Lay in Dust, Dublin: Dolmen Press
 Seamus Heaney, Death of a Naturalist, Faber & Faber, Northern Ireland poet published in the United Kingdom
 Thomas Kinsella, Wormwood, Dublin: Dolmen Press; book widely available in the United Kingdom
 Louis MacNeice, The Collected Poems of Louis MacNeice, edited by E. R. Dodds, including "Mayfly", "Snow", "Autumn Journal XVI", "Meeting Point", "Autobiography", "the Libertine", "Western Landscape", "Autumn Sequel XX", "The Once-in-Passing", "House on a Cliff", "Soap Suds", "The Suicide" and "Star-gazer", Faber and Faber, Irish poet published in the United Kingdom,
 John Montague, All Legendary Obstacles, Dublin: Dolmen Press

United Kingdom
 W. H. Auden, English poet published in the United States:
 About the House, first published in the United States, 1965
 Collected Shorter Poems 1927–57
 Karen Gershon, Selected Poems
 Gavin Bantock, Christ
 George Barker, Dreams of a Summer Night
 John Betjeman, High and Low
 Basil Bunting, Briggflatts
 Angela Carter, Unicorn
 Lawrence Durrell, The Ikons, and Other Poems
 Tom Earley, A Welshman in Bloomsbury
 Gavin Ewart, Pleasures of the Flesh
 Elaine Feinstein, In a Green Eye, Goliard Press
 Robert Graves, Collected Poems
 J. C. Hall, The Burning Hare
 Seamus Heaney, Death of a Naturalist, Faber & Faber, Northern Ireland poet published in the United Kingdom
 Philip Hobsbaum, In Retreat
 Christopher Isherwood, Exhumations, stories, articles and poetry; an English writer living in and published in the United States
 Elizabeth Jennings, The Mind Has Mountains
 Thomas Kinsella, Wormwood, Irish poet published in the United Kingdom
 Philip Larkin, The North Ship
 Richard Logue, Logue's ABC
 Norman MacCaig, Surroundings
 Louis MacNeice, The Collected Poems of Louis MacNeice, edited by E. R. Dodds, including "Mayfly", "Snow", "Autumn Journal XVI", "Meeting Point", "Autobiography", "the Libertine", "Western Landscape", "Autumn Sequel XX", "The Once-in-Passing", "House on a Cliff", "Soap Suds", "The Suicide" and "Star-gazer", Faber and Faber, Irish poet published in the United Kingdom,
 Ruth Pitter, Still by Choice
 Sir Herbert Read, Collected Poems, Horizon Press
 Peter Redgrove, The Force and Other Poems, London: Routledge and Kegan Paul
 Jon Silkin, New and Selected Poems
 Stevie Smith, The Frog Prince, and Other Poems
 Gillian Smyth, The Nitrogen Dreams of a Wide Girl
 Gary Snyder, A Range of Poems, London: Fulcrum Press, American
 R.S. Thomas, Pietà, Welsh
 Anthony Thwaite and John Hollander publish the first anthology of double dactyls, Jiggery Pokery
 Charles Tomlinson, American Scenes, and Other Poems, London: Macmillan
 David Wevill, A Christ of the Ice Floes

United States
 A.R. Ammons, Northfield Poems
 John Ashbery, Rivers and Mountains
 Ted Berrigan, Some Things
 Paul Blackburn,
 16 Sloppy Haiku and a Lyric for Robert Reardon
 Sing Song
 translator, Poem of the Cid
 Gwendolyn Brooks, We Real Cool
 Robert Creeley, Poems 1950-1965
 Robert Duncan, The Years as Catches
 Randall Jarrell (died 1965), The Lost World (published posthumously)
 Josephine Jacobsen, The Animal Inside
 LeRoi Jones, Black Art
 Stanley Kunitz, The Testing Tree
 James Merrill, Nights and Days
 W. S. Merwin, Collected Poems, New York: Atheneum
 Sylvia Plath, Ariel, New York: Harper & Row (London: Faber and Faber 1965) American poet in the United Kingdom
 A. K. Ramanujan, The Striders (Indian poet living in the United States)
 Kenneth Rexroth, Collected Shorter Poems
 Adrienne Rich, Necessities of Life, W. W. Norton & Company
 Theodore Roethke, Roethke: Collected Poems
 Anne Sexton, Live or Die
 Louis Simpson, Selected Poems (West Indian poet living in the United States)
 Gary Snyder, A Range of Poems, London: Fulcrum Press
 William Stafford, The Rescued Year
 Robert Penn Warren, Selected Poems, New and Old: 1923-1966
 Louis Zukofsky, All: the collected short poems 1956–1964, W. W. Norton & Company

Criticism, scholarship, biography
 Wallace Stevens, Letters of Wallace Stevens (posthumous), edited by Holly Stevens (his daughter)

Other in English
 James K. Baxter, Pig Island Letters (New Zealand)
 Louise Bennett, Jamaica Labrish, Jamaica
 John Pepper Clark, A Reed in the Tide (Nigeria)
 Keith Harrison, Points in a Journey (Australia)

Works published in other languages
Listed by language and often by nation where the work was first published and again by the poet's native land, if different; substantially revised works listed separately:

Denmark
 Benny Anderson (poet), Portrætgalleri
 Thorkild Bjørnvig, Vibrationer
 Poul Borum, Dagslys
 Jørgen Gustava Brandt, Der er æg i mit skæg (prose sketches and poetry)
 Knud Holst, Samexistens
 Henrik Nordbrandt, Digte ("Poems")
 Bundgård Povlsen, Døgndrift

Finland
 Paavo Haavikko, Puut, kaikki heidän vihreytensä, ("The Trees, All Their Greenness")
 Eeva-Liisa Manner, Kirjoitettu kivi ("The Inscribed Stone"), poems and translations from contemporary Spanish poets
 Pentti Saarikoski, Ääneen ("Out Loud")

French language

Canada, in French
 Roger Brien:
 Prométhée
 Le Jour se lève
 Roland Giguère, L'Age de la parole
 Marie Laberge, D'un Cri à l'autre
 Rina Lasnier, L'Arbre blanc
 Suzanne Paradis, Le Visage offensé
 Jean Royer, À patience d'aimer, Québec: Éditions-de-l'Aile
 Gemma Tremblay, Cratères sous la niege

France
 Louis Aragon:
 Elégie a Pablo Neruda
 Les Poetes
 L. Brauquier, a book of poetry
 P. Chabaneix, a book of poetry
 René Char:
 Recherche de la base et du sommet, Retour amont ("The Return Upland" or "The Return Upstream")
 Retour Amont
 Michel Déguy:
 Actes
 Ouï-dire
 Pierre Emmanuel, Ligne de faîte
 Andre Frenaud, Les Rois Mages, revised edition (first edition, 1943)
 Pierre Emmanuel, pen name of Noël Mathieu, Ligne de faîte
 Gérard Genette, Figures I, one of three volumes of a work of critical scholarship in poetics – general theory of literary form and analysis of individual works — the Figures volumes are concerned with the problems of poetic discourse and narrative in Stendhal, Flaubert and Proust and in Baroque poetry (see also Figures II 1969, Figures III 1972)
 Eugène Guillevic, Avec
 Robert Marteau, Travaux sur la terre
 A. Miatlev, Thanathème
 Jean-Claude Renard, La Terre du sacré, received the 1966 Prix Sainte-Beuve
 A. Richaud, Je ne suis pas mort
 P. Seghers, Dialogue
 J. Tortel, Les Villes ouvertes
 Dominique Tron, Stéréophonies
 Boris Vian, a book of poetry

Belgium
 R. Goffin, a book of poetry in the publishing series "Poètes d'Aujourd'hui", French language, published in Belgium

Germany

West Germany
 Günter Eich, Anlässe und Steingärten
 Beda Allemann, editor, Ars poetica: Texte von Dichtern des 20. Jahrhunderts zur Poetik, 51 essays, Wissenschaftliche Buchgesellschaft, (criticism)
 Walter Naumann, Traum und Tradition in der deutschen Lyrik, Stuttgart: Kohlhammer Verlag (criticism)

Translations
 Oswald de Andrade (Brazil), translations of his:
 Livro de Ensaios
 Gálaxias

East Germany
 Wolf Biermann, Die Drahtharfe
 Volker Braun, Vorläufiges

Hebrew

Israel
 Reuven Ben-Yosef, Shehafim Mamtinim ("Waiting Gulls") American-born poet
 David Fogel, collected poems, with an introduction by D. Pagis
 S. Halkin, Maavar Yabok ("Crossing Jabbok")
 C. Schirmann, a book of poetry: a compilation of new poems from the Genizah
 Shin Shalom, a book of his complete works
 N. Zach, Kol ha-Halav veha-Devash ("All the Milk and Honey")

India
Listed in alphabetical order by first name:
 Geeta Parikh, Purvi; Gujarati-language
 Hari Daryani, Mauj Kai Mehran, Sindhi-language
 Udaya Narayana Singh, Kavayo Vadanti, Calcutta: Mithila Darshan; Maithili-language

Italy
 Alfonso Gatto, La storia delle vittime (winner of the Premio Viareggio prize)
 Dacia Maraini, Crudeltà all'aria aperta
 Eugenio Montale, Xenia, poems in memory of Mosca, first published in a private edition of 50; Italy
 Antonio Porta, I rapporti
 Giovanni Raboni, Le case della Vetra
 Sergio Salvi, Le croci di Cartesio
 Roberto Sanesi, Rapporto informativo
 Maria Luisa Spaziani, Utilità della memoria

Norway
 Georg Johannesen, Nye dikt
 Sigmund Skard, Haustraun
 Einar Skjæraasen, Bumerke (posthumous)
 Ragnvald Skrede, Grunnmalm
 Stein Mehren, Tids Alder
 Jan Erik Vold, Hekt

Portuguese language

Brazil
 Oswald de Andrade, Complete Works, a new edition (posthumous)
 Manuel Bandiera, Estrêla da Vida Inteira, an anthology of his poems, commemorating his 80th birthday
 João Cabral de Melo Neto, A Educação pela Pedra
 Mário Faustino, Poesía
 Ferreira Gullar, Luta Corporal e Outros Poemas
 Mário da Silva Brito, Poemário da Silva Brito

Portugal
 Ruy de Moura Belo, Boca bilíngüe ("Multiple Meanings")

Russia
 Pavel Antokolski, two volumes of poems to celebrate his 70th birthday
 David Kugoltinov, a book of poems translated from Kalmuk published in the "Soviet Poetry Library" series
 Robert Rozhdestvenski, The Radius of Action, including "Letter to the Thirtieth Century"

Spanish language

Mexico
 José López Bermùdez, Canto a Morelos (Mexico)
 Rubén Bonifaz Nuño, Siete de espadas (Mexico)
 Octavio Paz, "Vrindaban" and "Madurai" two poems on a Hindu theme by the Mexican ambassador to India
 José Emilio Pacheco, El reposo del fuego (Mexico)
 Ramón López Velarde, Suave Patria (Mexico)

Spain
 Jaime Gil de Biedma:
 En favor de Venus, a collection
 Moralidades, a larger collection published in Mexico
 Carlos Barral, Figuración y fuga
 Alfonso Canales, Aminadab
 Gloria Fuertes, Ni tiro, veneno, ni navaja
 Justo Jorge Padrón, Escrito en el agua
 Dionisio Ridruejo, Cuaderno Catalán
 Joaquín Caro Romero, El tiempo en el espejo

Other in Spanish
 José Santos Chocano, Antología, pról. y notas de Julio Ortega, Lima: Editorial Universitaria, Peru

Yiddish
 Israel Emiot, a collection of poems
 Yankev Glatshteyn, A Jew from Lublin
 Gabriel Preil, a collection of poems
 Khava Rosenfarb, a collection of poems
 Meyer Shtiker, a collection of poems
 Moisei Teif (Moshe Teif), a collection of poems
 Leyb Vaserman, a collection of poems

Other languages
 Betti Alver, Tähetund ("Starry Hour"), Estonia
 Nizar Qabbani, Drawing with Words, Syrian poet writing in Arabic
 Giorgos Seferis, Τρία Κρυφά Ποιήματα ("Three Hidden Poems"), Greece
 Wisława Szymborska, 101 wierszy ("101 Poems"), Poland

Awards and honors
 Nobel Prize for Literature: Nelly Sachs, a German poet, writing in German but living in Sweden and a Swedish subject, shared the prize with novelist and short story writer Shmuel Yosef Agnon of Israel.

Awards in Canada
 See 1966 Governor General's Awards for a complete list of winners and finalists for those awards.

Awards in France
 Prix des Critiques: René Char, for his work as a whole
 Grand Prix de Poésie de l'Académie Française: Pierre Jean Jouve

Awards in the United Kingdom
 Cholmondeley Award: Ted Walker, Stevie Smith
 Eric Gregory Award: Robin Fulton, Seamus Heaney, Hugo Williams

Awards in the United States
 Consultant in Poetry to the Library of Congress (later the post would be called "Poet Laureate Consultant in Poetry to the Library of Congress"): James Dickey appointed this year.
 National Book Award for Poetry: James Dickey, Buckdancer's Choice
 Pulitzer Prize for Poetry: Richard Eberhart, Selected Poems
 Fellowship of the Academy of American Poets: Archibald MacLeish and John Berryman

Awards in Spain
 Premio de la Crítica (a nonmonetary award by a jury of journalist-critics): Claudio Rodriguez, Alianza y condena
 Premio Adonais for verse: Vincente García Hernández, Los pájaros

Other
 Nordic Council's literature prize: Gunnar Ekelöf, Diwan över fursten av Engion (Sweden)

Births
 April 8 – Todd Swift, Canadian-born British poet
 April 26 – Natasha Trethewey, American Poet Laureate
 May 28 – Roddy Lumsden (died 2020), Scottish poet
 June 12 – Michael Redhill, American-born Canadian poet
 August 10 – Christian Bök, Canadian experimental poet
 October 7 – Sherman Alexie, Native American poet and author
 October 19 – Dimitris Lyacos, Greek poet and playwright
 November 17 – Jane Holland, English poet and novelist (as Victoria Lamb, etc.)
 December 20 – Joseph Woods, Irish poet
 December 27 – Chris Abani, Nigerian poet
 Also:
 Maurice Manning, American poet
 Constance Merritt, American poet
 Daljit Nagra, English poet
 Alice Oswald, English poet
 Richard Price, British poet, curator and editor
 Volker Sielaff, German poet
 Christian Wiman, American poet
 Woeser (also written: Öser; full name: Tsering Woeser; Tibetan: ཚེ་རིང་འོད་ཟེར་; Wylie: tshe-ring 'od-zer; simplified Chinese: 唯色; pinyin: Wéisè), Tibetan poet and essayist
 Yi Sha, Chinese poet

Deaths

Birth years link to the corresponding "[year] in poetry" article:
 January 22 – Jun Kawada 川田 順, 84 (born 1882), Japanese, Shōwa period tanka poet and entrepreneur
 January 23 – Berton Braley, 83 (born 1882), American poet
 March 5 — Anna Akhmatova, 76 (born 1889), Russian poet
 March 17 – Einar Skjæraasen, 66 (born 1900), Norwegian author and poet
 March 29 – Arnold Wall, 97 (born 1869), New Zealand professor, philologist, poet, mountaineer and botanist
 April 5 – Marcel Noppeney (born 1877), Luxembourg French-language poet
 May 14 – Georgia Douglas Johnson, 86 (born 1880), African American poet and playwright, of a stroke
 June 1 – Inge Müller, 85 (born 1925), East German poet
 June 7 – Jean Arp, 79 (born 1886), French Alsatian sculptor, painter and poet, leader in Dadaism
 June 10 – Henry Treece, 54 (born 1911), English children's historical novelist and poet
 June 27 – Arthur Waley, 76 (born 1889), English translator of Chinese poetry, Orientalist and Sinologist
 July 11 – Delmore Schwartz, 52 (born 1913), American poet and short story writer, of a heart attack
 July 25 – Frank O'Hara, 40 (born 1926), American art curator and poet, key member of the New York School, of ruptured liver following automobile accident
 August 2 or 3 – Tristan Klingsor, pseudonym of Léon Leclère, 91 (born 1874), French poet, painter and musician, part of the fantaisiste school of French poets
 August 10 – J. C. Bloem, 79 (born 1887), Dutch poet
 August 12 – Artur Alliksaar, 43 (born 1923), Estonian poet, of cancer
 August 14
Raymond Duncan, 91 (born 1874), American-born dancer, artist, poet, craftsman and philosopher
Alfred Kreymborg, 82 (born 1883), American poet, novelist, playwright, literary editor and anthologist
 August 26 – W. W. E. Ross, 72 (born 1894), Canadian poet
 August 27 – John Cournos, 85 (born 1881), Russian-American Imagist poet, better known for his novels, short stories, essays, criticism and translations of Russian literature; wrote under the pen name "John Courtney"
 August 29 – Melvin B. Tolson, 68 (born 1898), African American Modernist poet, educator, columnist and politician
 September 25 – Mina Loy, 73 (born 1882), English-born American artist, poet, Futurist and actress
 September 28 – André Breton, 70 (born 1896), French poet, essayist and theorist, the leading exponent of Surrealism in literature
 December 9 – Lazarus Aaronson, 71 (born 1895), English poet and academic economist
 Also – Jun Tanaka 田中純 (born 1890), Japanese, Shōwa period poet

See also

 Poetry
 List of poetry awards
 List of years in poetry

Notes

Poetry
20th-century poetry